Tafadzwa Bernard Madondo (17 February 1981 – 17 November 2008) was a Zimbabwean cricketer. He was a right-handed batsman and right-arm off-break bowler and wicketkeeper who played for Manicaland. Born in Bindura, he was the brother of Test player Trevor Madondo.

Madondo made a single first-class appearance for the side, during the 2000–01 season, against Matabeleland. Batting in the lower order, Madondo scored ten runs in the first innings in which he batted, and a golden duck in the second innings, with Ian Engelbrecht trapping his second batsman in two balls leg before wicket. He was a tailend batsman.

He attended Falcon College.

He was killed at the age of 27, in November 2008, when he crashed his motorbike while vacationing in Bali.

References

External links
Tafadzwa Madondo at Cricket Archive

1981 births
2008 deaths
Motorcycle road incident deaths
Road incident deaths in Indonesia
Zimbabwean cricketers
Manicaland cricketers
Alumni of Falcon College